Asticcacaulis benevestitus is a Gram-negative, aerobic, heterotrophic and psychrotolerant bacterium from the genus of Asticcacaulis which has been isolated from shrub tundra wetland from the Polar Urals in Russia.

References 

Caulobacterales
Bacteria described in 2006